Verticia is a genus of flies (Diptera) in the family Calliphoridae. The genus was first described by J.R. Malloch in 1927.

Species
Verticia chani Kurahashi, Benjaphong & Omar, 1997
Verticia fasciventris Malloch, 1927
Verticia indochinica Kurahashi & Chowanadisai, 2001
Verticia nigra Malloch, 1927
Verticia orientalis Malloch, 1927
Verticia quatei Kurahashi & Chowanadisai, 2001

Biology
The larva of the species Verticia fasciventris are parasites and develop in the heads of termites.

The genus name was also used for Bacteria (the species Verticia sediminum) in 2015. A renaming to Verticiella was proposed in 2016 when the name was discovered to be a later homonym.

References

Calliphoridae
Oestroidea genera